The 1898–99 season was Newcastle United's first season in the Football League First Division, the top flight of English football at the time. Newcastle finished the season in 13th place.

Appearances and goals

Competitions

League

FA Cup

Friendlies

Matches

League

FA Cup

Friendlies

External links
Newcastle United – Historical Football Kits
Season Details – 1898–99 – toon1892
NUFC.com Archives – Match Stats – 1898–99
Newcastle United 1898–1899 Home – statto.com

Newcastle United F.C. seasons
Newcastle United